Geba may mean:
Geba River, a river in Guinea, Senegal, and Guinea-Bissau
Geba River (Ethiopia), a tributary of the Tekezé River
Geba (city), a city in ancient Israel
Geba, Republic of Dagestan, a rural locality in Dagestan, Russia
Geba Station, a railway station in Tagajō, Miyagi Prefecture, Japan
Geba syllabary, the system for writing the Naxi language
Genomic Encyclopedia of Bacteria and Archaea, a project to sequence bacterial genomes and to establish their phylogenetic relationships
Gimnasia y Esgrima de Buenos Aires (GEBA), a sports club in Buenos Aires, Argentina